Straube is a German surname that may refer to:

 Emil J. Straube (born 1952), Swiss and American mathematician
 Erich Straube (1887 - 1971), German general
 Karl Straube (1873 – 1950), German church musician, organist, and choral conductor
 Kasper Straube (15th century), German printer
  (1717- 1785), German composer, J. S. Bach's pupil

See also 
 Straub
 Straube Piano Company

German-language surnames